Helpcheck is a legal tech company from Düsseldorf. The company was founded in 2016 by Peer Schulz and Phil Sokowicz as a “justice-as-a-service” platform for consumer rights, providing people with access to justice, in the life insurance sector.

Developments 
The startup raised €13 million from a German family office. The start-up sees new opportunities through a recent ruling by the European Court of Justice (ECJ) on the revocation of credit agreements.  Helpcheck enables consumers to obtain their legitimate claims that are denied by insurance companies.  The legal tech maintains a digital platform integrating lawyers and industry experts.

Legal battle 
Customers who took out life insurance between 1994 and 2007 and are dissatisfied with the return on the contract may still be able to withdraw the policy to date. In addition to the contributions paid, the customer will then also receive back the interest accrued on them. The background is a 2014 ruling by the Federal Court of Justice, according to which insured persons may revoke a contract if the provider has not informed them of their right to object or has only insufficiently informed them (Az: IV ZR 76/11).

See also 

 List of companies of Germany

References

External links 

 Helpcheck

2016 establishments in Germany
Companies established in 2016
Companies based in Düsseldorf
Companies of Germany